Campbell Township is one of eleven townships in Jennings County, Indiana, United States. As of the 2010 census, its population was 1,191 and it contained 498 housing units.

Campbell Township was established in 1825.

History
Edward's Ford Bridge was listed on the National Register of Historic Places in 1996.

Geography

Unincorporated towns
 Butlerville
 Nebraska

Adjacent townships
 Columbia Township (north)
 Otter Creek Township, Ripley County (northeast)
 Shelby Township, Ripley County (southeast)
 Bigger Township (south)
 Vernon Township (southwest)
 Center Township (west)
 Sand Creek Township (northwest)

Cemeteries
The township contains five cemeteries: Butlerville, Hopewell, Otter Creek, Saint Bridget and State School.

Major highways
  U.S. Route 50

References
 
 United States Census Bureau cartographic boundary files

External links

Townships in Jennings County, Indiana
Townships in Indiana